The Western Carolina Catamounts football program represents Western Carolina University. The team competes in the NCAA Division I Football Championship Subdivision (FCS) and are members of the Southern Conference. Since the school's first football team was fielded in 1931, the Catamounts have a record of 341-502-23, have made two postseason appearances, and have played in one national championship game.

Western Carolina plays its home games at the 13,742 seat Bob Waters Field at E. J. Whitmire Stadium located on the campus in Cullowhee, North Carolina.

History

Head coaching history

Western Carolina has had 14 head coaches since the first team was organized in 1931. Kerwin Bell, the current head coach, was hired on April 27, 2021. Bob Waters (1969–1988) holds the record for most wins (116), longest tenure (20 seasons), and highest winning percentage (.550) among all former Western Carolina coaches.

C.C. Poindexter, often called the "Father of Western Carolina Athletics", was instrumental in organizing the first football team in 1931. Then the Western Carolina Teacher's College, Poindexter was the first person hired by the college to work exclusively in athletics and became the first athletic director and football coach. He would later lead the baseball and basketball programs as well.

Postseason
 1949 - The 1949 Western Carolina Catamounts, coached by Tom Young, completed their regular season 8–2, winning the North State Conference championship. Western Carolina was then invited to play West Liberty State in the Smokey Mountain Bowl in Bristol, Tennessee. The Catamounts fell short 20–0.  
1974 - The 1974 Western Carolina Catamounts, coached by Bob Waters, completed their regular season 9–1, earning a birth to the 1974 NCAA Division II playoff. The Catamounts had wins over ranked opponents Indiana State and Western Kentucky during the season. They then traveled to No.1 ranked Louisiana Tech where they were defeated 10–7. 
1983 - The 1983 Western Carolina Catamounts, coached by Bob Waters, completed their regular season 8-2-1, earning a birth to the 1983 NCAA Division I-AA playoffs. The Catamounts then hosted their first ever playoff game against Colgate, winning 24–23. Western Carolina then traveled to No.2 seed Holy Cross, where they upset the Crusaders 28–21. In the semifinals, they beat No.3 seed, and Southern Conference rival, Furman 14–7. In the 1983 Division I-AA National Championship Game at Hagood Stadium in Charleston, South Carolina, the Catamounts fell to No.1 seed Southern Illinois 43–7.

Classifications
1973–1976: NCAA Division II
1977: NCAA Division I
1978–1981: NCAA Division I–A
1982–present: NCAA Division I–AA

Conference memberships
1931–1932: Independent
1933–1960: North State Conference
1961–1967: Conference Carolinas
1968–1972: Independent
1973–1976: NCAA Division II Independent
1977–present: Southern Conference
Also members of the Smoky Mountain Conference starting in 1934.

Playoff appearances

NCAA Division I-AA/FCS
The Catamounts have appeared in the I-AA/FCS playoffs one time, with an overall record of 3–1.

NCAA Division II
The Catamounts made one appearance in the Division II playoffs, with a combined record of 0–1.

Rivalries

Appalachian State - Battle for the Old Mountain Jug

The main rivalry of the Catamounts was against their in-state rival Appalachian State. Western Carolina and Appalachian State played annually for the Old Mountain Jug. The two rivals first faced off in 1932, with Appalachian State winning 20–0. The Old Mountain Jug trophy was first introduced in 1976. After Appalachian State moved to the Football Bowl Subdivision in 2014, the two have not met since. Appalachian State leads the series 58–19–1. Appalachian State's Biggest win is 54-7 in 1939 and Western Carolina's Biggest win is 44-14 in 1977.

Catamounts in the NFL

Future non-conference opponents 
Announced schedules as of December 8, 2022.

See also
Western Carolina Catamounts

References

External links

 
American football teams established in 1931
1931 establishments in North Carolina